Jean-Roger Caussimon (24 July 1918 – 19 October 1985) was a "provocative, anarchising" French singer-songwriter and film actor. He appeared in 90 films between 1945 and 1985 but is better known for having worked with poet-singer Léo Ferré.

Discography

Studio albums
 Jean-Roger Caussimon chante Jean-Roger Caussimon (1970) 
 À la Seine (1972)
 Musique légère (1974)
 Il fait soleil (1975)
 Chanson de l'homme heureux (1977)
 Papy rock (1979)

Live albums
 Au théâtre de la Ville (1978)

Posthumous releases
 En public à l'Olympia 74 (1992)
 Jean-Roger Caussimon au cabaret du Lapin Agile (2003)

Selected filmography

 François Villon (1945) - Le grand écolier
 The Last Judgment (1945)
 Pétrus (1946) - Milou
 Destiny Has Fun (1946) - Marcel
 Captain Blomet (1947) - Clodomir
 La fleur de l'âge (1947)
 Le mannequin assassiné (1948) - Jérôme
 Scandals of Clochemerle (1948) - Samotras
 The Murdered Model (1948) - L'inspecteur
 Bonheur en location (1949) - Julien
 The Man from Jamaica (1950) - Le docteur Van Boeken
 The Red Rose (1951) - L'homme du bar
 Juliette, or Key of Dreams (1951) - Le châtelain & Monsieur Bellanger
 The Red Inn (1951) - Darwin
 Milady and the Musketeers (1952) - Mastro Pietro / Boia di Lilla
 La Reine Margot (1954) - Le gouverneur de la prison / Prison Governor
 French Cancan (1955) - Baron Walter
 Bel Ami (1955) - Charles Forestier
 House on the Waterfront (1955) - Monsieur Black
 La villa Sans-Souci (1955) - Jarewski
 Fernand cow-boy (1956) - Castor Prudent
 Et par ici la sortie (1957) - Picatellos
 Three Sailors (1957) - Éric Bergen
 Ce joli monde (1957) - Joseph
 Un homme se penche sur son passé (1958) - Stopwell
 Quand sonnera midi (1958) - Don Gaspar
 The Mask of the Gorilla (1958) - Léon
 Le Sicilien (1958) - Beau Parleur
 Dangerous Games (1958) - Bourdieux
 Le petit prof (1959) - Le proviseur
 Le Saint mène la danse (1960) - Le maître d'hôtel
 The Return of Dr. Mabuse (1961) - Küster
 La Fayette (1962) - Maurepas
 À fleur de peau (1962) - M. Brémont
 Hardi Pardaillan! (1964) - Ruggieri
 Les baratineurs (1965) - L'héraldiste
 L'amour à la chaîne (1965) - Le curé
 The Treasure of the Aztecs (1965) - Marshal Bazaine
The Pyramid of the Sun God (1965)  - Marshall Bazaine (uncredited)
 Thomas the Impostor (1965) - L'évêque
 Pleins feux sur Stanislas (1965) - Le faux conservateur en chef
 Dis-moi qui tuer (1965) - Kopf
 Deux heures à tuer (1966) - Gabriel Damerville
 Triple Cross (1966) - Luftwaffe General
 Fantômas contre Scotland Yard (1967) - Lord Edward MacRashley / Fantômas
 Law Breakers (1971) - Le commissaire Lagache
 Tout le monde il est beau, tout le monde il est gentil (1972) - Le père Derugleux
 Five Leaf Clover (1972) - Vampirus
 Moi y'en a vouloir des sous (1973) - L'évêque
 Que la fête commence (1975) - Le cardinal
 The Judge and the Assassin (1976) - Street Singer
 Deux imbéciles heureux (1976) - Albert Breux
 The Gendarme and the Extra-Terrestrials (1979) - L'évêque
 Signé Furax (1981) - Le jardinier
 Les Misérables (1982) - Le Conventionnel
 La baraka (1982) - Le clochard

References

External links

1918 births
1985 deaths
French male film actors
Male actors from Paris
Singers from Paris
20th-century French male actors
20th-century French male singers
French anarchists